Hutchesons' Hall is an early nineteenth-century building in Ingram Street, in the centre of Glasgow, Scotland. It is owned and maintained by the Rusk Company and National Trust for Scotland, and is a category A listed building.

The current building was constructed, as Hutchesons' Hospital, between 1802 and 1805 to a design by the Scottish architect David Hamilton. This building was to replace an earlier hospital of 1641 in the city's Trongate, which needed to be removed to created Hutcheson Street. Hamilton's design incorporates in its frontage statues (carved in 1649 by James Colquhoun) from this earlier hospital.

Hutcheson's Hospital was built with monies left in the will of brothers George Hutcheson (c. 1580-1639) and Thomas Hutcheson (1589-1641) for the purposes of building a hospital for the elderly and a school for poor boys. The school is still operating today, although fee-paying, as Hutchesons' Grammar School.

In 1876, the architect John Baird was commissioned to refurbish the hall. This work heightened the structure and added a feature staircase.

The building fell into disrepair and had been empty since 2008.  In June 2014, having undergone a £1.4M refurbishment, it was restored by James Rusk of The Rusk Company and opened as a three flooring dining venue - Hutchesons steak and seafood house.

References

External links
"Statues of the Hutcheson Brothers" Glasgow - City of Sculpture By Gary Nisbet
"Glasgow's Merchant City"  - Site with before and after photographs of Hutcheson's Hall

Infrastructure completed in 1805
National Trust for Scotland properties
Buildings and structures in Glasgow
Category A listed buildings in Glasgow
1805 establishments in Scotland